Alter Ego is the sixth studio album by American singer and songwriter Prince Royce. It was released on February 7, 2020 by Sony Music Latin, preceded by the release of seven singles which include "El Clavo", "Adicto", "Cúrame", "Morir Solo", "Trampa", "Dec. 21" and "Cita". The album includes collaborations with artists such as DaniLeigh, Marc Anthony, Wisin & Yandel, Zion & Lennox, Manuel Turizo and Maluma.

Commercial performance
The album debuted at number 1 on the Top Latin Albums Chart, and sold 11,000 album-equivalent units, during its first week of release in the United States.

Track listing
The physical CD version is a double album. Meaning that it contained 2 disc.

Charts

Weekly charts

Year-end charts

Album certifications

References

2020 albums
Prince Royce albums
Spanish-language albums
Sony Music Latin albums